Joub Jannine ( / ALA-LC: Jub Jannīn) is located in the Beqaa Valley in Lebanon.

Joub Jannine is the capital of West Beqaa. It is a town and the center of the Western Beqaa District, hosting the Serail, which is a main governmental building serving the area. Joub Jannine is the largest and most populated town in its district with a population of 14,728. All major banks exist in Joub Jannine as well as a trades college, Amusement Park, indoor/outdoor soccer arena, basketball court and the weekly Souk which takes place every Saturday and is a local produce market.

Joub Jannine is surrounded by a number of villages. To the south there is the village of Lala, Ghazze to the north, Kamid al lawz to the east, and Kefraya, known for its wine grape vineyards, to the west.

History
In 1838, Eli Smith noted  Jubb Jenin  as a Sunni Muslim village in the Beqaa Valley.

Archaeological sites
Joub Jannine I is a small surface site brought to the surface through erosional activity of a stream. It is 8 km northeast of Qaraoun in a range of foothills, 1 km north of a small village called Jebel Gharbi, between two tracks, west of cote 878 by about 200 m. The site was found by Dubertret with a collection made by Henri Fleisch and Maurice Tallon that is now in the Museum of Lebanese Prehistory at the Saint Joseph University. Flint tools found on the site included bifaces and rough pieces that were suggested to date to the Acheulean.

Joub Jannine II was first discovered by M. Billaux in 1957. It was described by Henri Fleisch as Neolithic in 1960. It is located on the right bank of the Litani River northwest of the village, 100 m from the river and 100 m east of cote 861. An abundant amount of flint was collected including nine hundred and forty four tools and one hundred and fifty two cores. This was first reported to be a paleolithic industry by Lorraine Copeland and Peter Wescombe. A highly specialized archaeological industry of striking spheroid and trihedral flint tools was found at the site and published by Fleisch in 1960, termed by Copeland and Wescombe as the Trihedral Neolithic. Little has been said about this industry or the ancient people that would have used these huge rock mauls (i.e. hammers) in this area, at the dawn of agriculture, or what they would have been using them for.

The material from Joub Jannine II was described by Lorraine Copeland as 

It was discovered by Henri Fleisch and Maurice Tallon in 1957. An abundant amount of material was recovered, which included several large flakes and blades along with a finer series of rabots and scrapers that is now held in the Museum of Lebanese Prehistory at the Saint Joseph University. No large bifaces were found at this site. The site may extend through the areas now turned into gardens. It was covered in crops in 1966.

Tourism & Nightlife

Tourism 
Joub Jannine is not really known for tourism. However, it is home to one of the oldest bridges in Lebanon, called The Roman Bridge of Joub Jannine (built in 704 AD). The bridge collapsed in 1943, but it was rebuilt with the same rocks and is currently identical to the bridge the Romans built. It is located at the entrance of Joub Jannine on Joub Jannine-Chtoura Rd.

Nightlife 
Joub Jannine is known for its variety in restaurants and cafes which make it a destination town for most surrounding villages. All restaurants and fast food joints serve Nargila (Shisha). 
Nightlife exists but limited due to the towns size and distance from the major cities. Nightlife is limited to some operating cafeterias, bars and restaurants around the town which serve alcoholic drinks and quick bite plates and stay open a little past midnight.

References

Bibliography

External links
 Joub Jannine, Localiban 
 Chateau Kefraya Website

Populated places in Western Beqaa District
Sunni Muslim communities in Lebanon

Great Rift Valley
Archaeological sites in Lebanon
Beqaa Valley
Trihedral Neolithic sites
Heavy Neolithic sites
Archaeological type sites